List of Dynasty episodes may refer to:

List of Dynasty (1981 TV series) episodes, a 1981–1989 US drama series
List of Dynasty (2017 TV series) episodes, a 2017–present reboot of the 1981 series